The 2021 The Women's Cup was the inaugural edition of a friendly invitational tournament of women's association football matches. It took place in Lynn Family Stadium of Louisville, Kentucky, United States, from August 18 to 21, 2021.

Hosts Racing Louisville FC won the tournament, defeating Bayern Munich on penalties. Paris Saint-Germain defeated Chicago Red Stars 1–0 in the third-place match.

Teams

Venue

Broadcasting 
In 2021, The Women's Cup was streamed exclusively on Paramount+ in the United States.

Bracket

Matches 
The initial match of the tournament, a semi-final match featuring the Chicago Red Stars and Racing Louisville FC, was also teams' scheduled regular season National Women's Soccer League match, and the regulation result was represented in the league standings. That match's result was a draw, so to resolve the result for The Women's Cup, the teams engaged in a post-match penalty shootout that was not counted as part of the NWSL match.

Semi-finals

Third place play-off

Championship

See also 
 National Women's Soccer League (United States)
 Frauen-Bundesliga (Germany)
 Division 1 (France)

References

External links 
 

2021
2021 in women's association football
2021 in American women's soccer
August 2021 sports events in the United States